The Yunnan Ethnic Village is an ethnographic village and theme park that displays the various folklore, culture, and architecture of 26 ethnic groups in Yunnan Province, China. The park's major goal is mainly to display some aspects of Yunnan's ethnicity, cultural diversity, and heritage. Located in the southwest suburbs of Kunming next to Dianchi lake, Yunnan Ethnic Village covers an area of 89 hectares including 31 hectares of water. It is classified as a AAAA-class tourist attraction.

Ethnic groups represented
The following ethnic groups are represented in the Yunnan Ethnic Village:
Dai
Bai
Yi
Naxi
Wa
Bulang
Jinuo
Lahu
Tibetan
Jingpo
Hani
De Ang
Zhuang
Hmong
Shui
Nu
Mongol
Buyi
Dulong
Lisu
Pumi
Manchu
Hui
Yao
Achang

Special events
Water-Splashing Festival (April 13-16) of Dai minority
Torch Festival (June 24 in the lunar calendar) of Yi minority
New Rice Festival (新米节:pinyin: xīn mǐ jié) of Jinuo minority, from the end of July to the beginning of August

Transport
1310 Dianchi Road, Kunming, Yunnan. It is served by buses No. 44, 73, and A1.

See also 
 China Folk Culture Village

References

Enternal links

Ethnographic villages
AAAA-rated tourist attractions
Chinese folk culture
Ethnic groups in China
Folk museums in China
Tourist attractions in Kunming